Events from the year 1656 in Denmark.

Incumbents 
 Monarch – Frederick III
 Steward of the Realm – Joachim Gersdorff

Events

Births
 11 September – Ulrika Eleonora of Denmark, Queen consort of Sweden (died 1693 in Sweden)

Deaths

References 

 
Denmark
Years of the 17th century in Denmark